Raúl Guerra Garrido (4 April 1935 – 2 December 2022) was a Spanish writer. He was the recipient of the 1975 Premio Nadal for Lectura insólita de El Capital and the 1984 Premio Planeta de Novela for La guerra del Wolfram.

Guerra Garrido died in San Sebastián on 2 December 2022, at the age of 87.

Bibliography

Novels
Ni héroe ni nada (1969)
Cacereño (1970)
El pornógrafo (1971)
¡Ay! (1972)
La fuga de un cerebro (1973)
Hipótesis (1975)
Lectura insólita de 'El Capital''' (1976)Copenhague no existe (1979)La costumbre de morir (1981)Escrito en un dólar (1983)El año del wólfram (1984)La mar es mala mujer (1987)La carta (1990)El síndrome de Scott (1993)Tantos inocentes (1996)Castilla en canal (1999)El otoño siempre hiere (2000)La Gran Vía es Nueva York (2004)La soledad del ángel de la guarda (2007)Quien sueña novela (2010)La estrategia del outsider o la vuelta al mundo de Naraya Sola (2012)Demolición (2018)

Short storiesLa sueca desnuda (1984)Maitasun objetu eztizkoa (1988)Viaje a una provincia de interior (1990)Micrófono oculto (1991)

EssaysMedicamentos españoles (1972)El telemirón (1982)Mis más bellas derrotas (1994)Esto no es un ensayo sobre Miró (1994)Tertulia de rebotica (2016)Un morroi chino con un higo en la coleta'' (2018)

Awards
 (1972)
Premio Nadal (1975)
Premio Planeta de Novela (1984)
 (1997)
Order of Constitutional Merit (2003)
Premio Nacional de las Letras Españolas (2006)
 (2011)
 (2019)

References

1935 births
2022 deaths
Spanish writers
Writers from Madrid